Erik Källström (5 March 1908 – 16 January 1997) was a Swedish footballer. He competed in the men's tournament at the 1936 Summer Olympics.

References

External links
 
 

1908 births
1997 deaths
Swedish footballers
Sweden international footballers
Olympic footballers of Sweden
Footballers at the 1936 Summer Olympics
People from Borås
Association football defenders
IF Elfsborg players
Sportspeople from Västra Götaland County